The 2006 season of Úrvalsdeild was the 95th season of league football in Iceland. FH defended their title making them the fifth club in Icelandic football history to win the championship three years running. ÍBV were relegated for the first time in 16 years and Grindavík suffered relegation for the first time in the club's history. An attendance record was set this season as 98,026 people saw the 90 matches, an average of 1,089.17 people per match.

Final league positions

Results
Each team played every opponent once home and away for a total of 18 matches.

Top goal scorers 
The player who has scored the most goals at the end of each tournament receives the Icelandic Golden Boot.

Promoted teams
These two teams were promoted from 1. deild karla at the start of the season:
Breiðablik
Víkingur

These two teams will be promoted from 1. deild karla at the start of next season:
Handknattleiksfélag Kópavogs (HK)
Fram

Relegated teams
These two teams were relegated to 1. deild karla at the end of the season:
ÍBV
Grindavík

Úrvalsdeild karla (football) seasons
1
Iceland
Iceland